Mansory is a luxury car modification firm based in Brand, Germany. Besides luxury cars, they also work on supercars, luxury SUVs and custom bikes. The company was founded in 1989 by Iranian-British tuner Kourosh Mansory. His Munich-based workshop focused on modifications for British brands such as Rolls-Royce and Italian brands such as Ferrari. By mid-2001, the company had grown out of its Munich workshop and moved to headquarters in Fichtelgebirge. The company currently operates out of a workshop in Brand, Germany.

Mansory works on vehicles from a number of manufacturers, including Aston Martin, Audi, Bentley, BMW, Bugatti, Ferrari, Lamborghini, Lotus Cars, Maserati, Mercedes-Benz, Rolls-Royce, and Tesla. In November 2007, Mansory acquired the Porsche-tuning arm of Rinspeed AG. Rinspeed maintains its Swiss base in Zumikon at Lake Zurich. Currently, Mansory employs 182 members of staff worldwide and has a global dealership network.

Mansory's worldwide distribution network includes dealerships in Germany, United Kingdom, India, China, Canada, Poland, Russia, United States, Japan, Greece, Switzerland, Iceland, UAE and a few other countries.

Garia Mansory Edition

At the 2011 Frankfurt Motor Show, Mansory announced a commercial agreement with Garia. The company produced a series of special edition golf and leisure cars for wealthy clients. These cars were characterised by carbon fibre body panels on the front, side steps and tail and elements of teak decking.

Collaboration with Lotus Group

In 2012, Mansory signed an agreement with Lotus Group, then under the control of Dany Bahar who had ambitious expansion plans. Under the agreement, Mansory would provide its services to Lotus customers who would require bodywork, trim and special finishes for Lotus' the Elise, Exige and Evora range. The partnership developed following a series of one-off models produced by Mansory for Lotus including the Evora Concept Bespoke unveiled at the 2011 Geneva Motor Show.

The partnership fell through shortly afterwards when Dany Bahar was removed as CEO of Lotus Group. In March 2019 Mansory released the GTE Final Edition at the Geneva Motor Show 2019, based on the Evora.

Gallery

See also
Car tuning
Luxury vehicle

References

External links
Mansory Official Site
Mansory Switzerland Official Site

Auto parts suppliers of Germany
Automotive companies established in 1989
Automotive motorsports and performance companies
Companies based in Bavaria
1989 establishments in Germany
German brands
Auto tuning companies